The 2019 ICF Canoe Sprint World Championships, the 45th edition of the World Championships, were held in Szeged, Hungary from 21 to 25 August 2019.

The championships served as the primary qualification regatta for the 2020 Olympic and Paralympic Games in Tokyo.

Explanation of events
Canoe sprint competitions were contested in either a Canadian canoe (C), an open canoe with a single-blade paddle, or in a kayak (K), a closed canoe with a double-bladed paddle. Each canoe or kayak can hold one person (1), two people (2), or four people (4). For each of the specific canoes or kayaks, such as a K-1 (kayak single), the competition distances can be 200, 500, 1000 or 5000 metres. When a competition is listed as a K-2 500m event, for example, it means two people were in a kayak competing over a distance of 500 metres.

Paracanoe competitions were contested in either a va'a (V), an outrigger canoe (which includes a second pontoon) with a single-blade paddle, or in a kayak (as above). All international competitions were held over 200 metres in single-man boats, with three event classes in both types of vessel for men and women depending on the level of an athlete's impairment. The lower the classification number, the more severe the impairment is – for example, VL1 is a va'a competition for those with particularly severe impairments.

Canoe sprint

Medal table

 Non-Olympic classes

Men

Canoe

Kayak

Women
 Non-Olympic classes

Canoe

Kayak

Paracanoe

Medal table

Medal events
 Non-Paralympic classes

Doping violation
On 19 August, the ICF announced that 11-time world champion Laurence Vincent-Lapointe was provisionally suspended from competition after testing positive for a banned substance. The substance in question was subsequently found to be Ligandrol, with Canoe Kayak Canada stating Ligandrol had been associated with recent tainted supplements and that preliminary information suggested Vincent-Lapointe's positive may have been the result of such.

References

External links
Official website
ICF website

 
ICF Canoe Sprint World Championships
World Canoe Sprint Championships
ICF Canoe Sprint World Championships
Canoe Championships
Sport in Szeged
Canoeing in Hungary
ICF Canoe Sprint World Championships